Euchontha moyobamba is a moth of the family Notodontidae first described by James S. Miller in 1989. It is found in Peru.

References

Moths described in 1989
Notodontidae of South America